The West Farms Square–East Tremont Avenue station (formerly the 177th Street station) is a local station on the IRT White Plains Road Line of the New York City Subway. Located at the intersection of East Tremont Avenue and Boston Road in the West Farms neighborhood of the Bronx, it is served by the  train at all times, and the  train at all times except late nights and rush hours in the peak direction.

History
The initial segment of the IRT White Plains Road Line opened on November 26, 1904 between 180th Street–Bronx Park and Jackson Avenue. Initially, trains on the line were served by elevated trains from the IRT Second Avenue Line and the IRT Third Avenue Line. Once the connection to the IRT Lenox Avenue Line opened on July 10, 1905, trains from the newly opened IRT subway ran via the line.

In Fiscal Year 1909, the installation of an escalator at the station was authorized.

To address overcrowding, in 1909, the New York Public Service Commission proposed lengthening platforms at stations along the original IRT subway. As part of a modification to the IRT's construction contracts, made on January 18, 1910, the company was to lengthen station platforms to accommodate ten-car express and six-car local trains. In addition to $1.5 million (equivalent to $ million in ) spent on platform lengthening, $500,000 was spent on building additional entrances and exits. It was anticipated that these improvements would increase capacity by 25 percent. The northbound platform at the 177th Street station was extended  to the rear, while the southbound platform was not lengthened. On January 23, 1911, ten-car express trains began running on the White Plains Road Line.

The New York State Transit Commission announced plans to extend the southbound platforms at seven stations on the line from Jackson Avenue to 177th Street to accommodate ten-car trains for $81,900 on August 8, 1934.

The city government took over the IRT's operations on June 12, 1940. The Bergen Avenue cutoff, which allowed Third Avenue trains to access the White Plains Road Line, was abandoned on November 5, 1946, as part of the gradual curtailment of elevated service on the IRT Third Avenue Line. On June 13, 1949, the platform extensions at this station, as well as those on White Plains Road Line stations south to Jackson Avenue, opened. Previously the stations could only accommodate six-car local trains.

On November 1, 1951, a contract for the construction of a mezzanine was awarded to Amdor Structures Incorporated. The mezzanine connected the subway station with a new escalator in Boston Road near the Bronx Zoo.

Station layout

This elevated station, situated on a high curve, one of the highest elevations on the line, has three tracks and two side platforms. The center track is used by the 5 train during rush hours in peak direction. The northbound platform is longer than the southbound one and can fit about 12 cars.

Both platforms have beige windscreens with green frames and outlines and green canopies with red roofs on their northern half and gray, waist-high, steel fences with lampposts at regular intervals on their southern half. The station name signs are in the standard black name plate in white lettering.

The 2004 artwork here is called Animal Tracks by Naomi Andrée Campbell.

Just north of the station are the abandoned trackways to 180th Street–Bronx Park, the original terminal of the White Plains Road Line.

Exits
This station has two elevated station houses below the platforms and tracks. The full-time one is at the center. Two staircases from each platform go down to a crossunder, where doors lead to a waiting area. Outside the turnstile bank that provides access to and from the station, there is a token booth, two staircases going down to the northeast corner of East Tremont Avenue and Boston Road, and one staircase and one enclosed escalator going down to the northwest corner. The station's other station house at the north end is unstaffed, containing one staircase from the northwest corner of East 178th Street and Boston Road, a set of High Entry-Exit Turnstiles, and two staircases to each platform.

References

External links 

 Tremont Avenue entrance from Google Maps Street View
Tremont Avenue entrance by escalator from Google Maps Street View
 178th Street entrance from Google Maps Street View
 Platforms from Google Maps Street View

IRT White Plains Road Line stations
New York City Subway stations in the Bronx
Railway stations in the United States opened in 1904
West Farms, Bronx